The Manhattan Cruise Terminal, formerly known as the New York Passenger Ship Terminal or Port Authority Passenger Ship Terminal is a ship terminal for ocean-going passenger ships in Hell's Kitchen, Manhattan, New York City.

History
The New York Passenger Ship Terminal originally consisted of Piers 88, 90, 92 and 94 on the Hudson River between West 46th and West 54th Street.

Piers 88-92 are each 1,100 feet (340 m) long and 400 feet (120 m) apart. They were first completed in 1935 to replace the Chelsea Piers as the city's luxury liner terminal. The new terminal was built to handle bigger ships that had outgrown the Chelsea Piers.

The plan was to lengthen a number of existing 800-foot piers, but the US Army Corps of Engineers, who controlled the waterfront dimension, would not allow the extension of the pierhead line farther into the river, so the city was forced to extend the pier by cutting away at the land. The city had previously done this for the Chelsea Piers, however in Chelsea only landfill was removed. At the Passenger Terminal, actual Manhattan schist was taken away. The results of this can also be seen in the West Side Highway's diversion eastward from West 57th to 42nd Street.

During World War II, the pier was in the news when the SS Normandie caught fire and subsequently capsized at its Pier 88 berth.

The NYPST piers were renovated in 1970 and in 2004 underwent another $200 million renovation to accommodate newer and larger cruise ships. The renovation plans included the decommissioning of Pier 92 and for the remaining piers to handle three large ships at a time.

Norwegian Cruise Line's ship the Norwegian Breakaway sails year-round out of the New York Passenger Ship Terminal. In 2011 the city committed $4 million to renovate and upgrade the cruise terminal to accommodate the ship.

For decades, the terminal was the only ocean-going passenger terminal in New York Harbor. Many major passenger ships have docked there, including the RMS Queen Mary 2 and Freedom of the Seas. With an upsurge in cruise ship traffic and the terminal's ability to comfortably handle only three large ships at a time, two new terminals have opened in the harbor — the Cape Liberty Cruise Port opened in 2004 in Bayonne, New Jersey (used by Royal Caribbean Cruise Line, Celebrity Cruises and Azamara Cruises), and the Brooklyn Cruise Terminal (used by the Queen Mary 2 and other ships of the Carnival Corporation cruise brands) opened in 2006 in Brooklyn.

In response to the COVID-19 pandemic, the  docked at Pier 90 to assist area medical facilities in caring for patients who do not have the virus.

Description
The current ship terminal now consists only of North River piers 88 and 90. With the opening of new piers elsewhere in the city, piers 92 and 94 were sold and are now used for exhibition space.

In 2003, the terminal handled 900,000 passengers, and in 2016, it handled 1.02 million.

References

External links
 Official website

Water transportation in New York City
Piers in New York City
Port of New York and New Jersey
Hell's Kitchen, Manhattan
Hudson River Park
West Side Highway
1935 establishments in New York City
Passenger ship terminals
Transport infrastructure completed in 1935